Thomas Loebb (born 11 July 1957 in Gelsenkirchen) is a German former water polo player who competed in the 1984 Summer Olympics.

See also
 List of Olympic medalists in water polo (men)
 List of World Aquatics Championships medalists in water polo

References

External links
 

1957 births
Living people
German male water polo players
Olympic water polo players of West Germany
Water polo players at the 1984 Summer Olympics
Olympic bronze medalists for West Germany
Olympic medalists in water polo
Sportspeople from Gelsenkirchen
Medalists at the 1984 Summer Olympics